Free Polish University, founded in 1918 in Warsaw, was a private high school with different departments: mathematics and natural sciences, humanities, political sciences and social pedagogy.

From 1929, its degrees were equivalent to those of university.

In the years 1919–1939 the institution employed 70–80 professors. In the academic year 1938/39 educated about 3000 students. The university conducted clandestine courses during the German occupation, but after the war, its activities were not resumed.

The university was disbanded in 1952.

See also
Education in Poland
 List of modern universities in Europe (1801–1945)

References

Universities and colleges in Warsaw
1918 establishments in Poland
Educational institutions established in 1918
Educational institutions disestablished in 1952